

Events

Pre-1600
 887 – Emperor Charles the Fat is deposed by the Frankish magnates in an assembly at Frankfurt, leading his nephew, Arnulf of Carinthia, to declare himself king of the East Frankish Kingdom in late November.
1183 – Genpei War: The Battle of Mizushima takes place off the Japanese coast, where Minamoto no Yoshinaka's invasion force is intercepted and defeated by the Taira clan.
1292 – John Balliol becomes King of Scotland.
1405 – Sharif ul-Hāshim establishes the Sultanate of Sulu.
1494 – French King Charles VIII occupies Florence, Italy.
1511 – Henry VIII of England concludes the Treaty of Westminster, a pledge of mutual aid against the French, with Ferdinand II of Aragon.
1558 – Elizabethan era begins: Queen Mary I of England dies and is succeeded by her half-sister Elizabeth I of England.

1601–1900
1603 – English explorer, writer and courtier Sir Walter Raleigh goes on trial for treason.
1777 – Articles of Confederation (United States) are submitted to the states for ratification.
1796 – French Revolutionary Wars: Battle of the Bridge of Arcole: French forces defeat the Austrians in Italy.
1800 – The United States Congress holds its first session in Washington, D.C.
1810 – Sweden declares war on its ally the United Kingdom to begin the Anglo-Swedish War, although no fighting ever takes place.
1811 – José Miguel Carrera, Chilean founding father, is sworn in as President of the executive Junta of the government of Chile.
1820 – Captain Nathaniel Palmer becomes the first American to see Antarctica. (The Palmer Peninsula is later named after him.)
1831 – Ecuador and Venezuela are separated from Gran Colombia.
1837 – An earthquake in Valdivia, south-central Chile, causes a tsunami that leads to significant destruction along Japan's coast.
1856 – American Old West: On the Sonoita River in present-day southern Arizona, the United States Army establishes Fort Buchanan in order to help control new land acquired in the Gadsden Purchase.
1858 – Modified Julian Day zero.
  1858   – The city of Denver, Colorado is founded.
1863 – American Civil War: Siege of Knoxville begins: Confederate forces led by General James Longstreet place Knoxville, Tennessee, under siege.
1869 – In Egypt, the Suez Canal, linking the Mediterranean Sea with the Red Sea, is inaugurated.
1878 – First assassination attempt against Umberto I of Italy by anarchist Giovanni Passannante, who was armed with a dagger. The King survived with a slight wound in an arm. Prime Minister Benedetto Cairoli blocked the aggressor, receiving an injury in a leg.
1885 – Serbo-Bulgarian War: The decisive Battle of Slivnitsa begins.
1894 – H. H. Holmes, one of the first modern serial killers, is arrested in Boston, Massachusetts.
1896 – The Western Pennsylvania Hockey League, which later became the first ice hockey league to openly trade and hire players, began play at Pittsburgh's Schenley Park Casino.

1901–present
1903 – The Russian Social Democratic Labour Party splits into two groups: The Bolsheviks (Russian for "majority") and Mensheviks (Russian for "minority").
1939 – Nine Czech students are executed as a response to anti-Nazi demonstrations prompted by the death of Jan Opletal. All Czech universities are shut down and more than 1,200 students sent to concentration camps. Since this event, International Students' Day is celebrated in many countries, especially in the Czech Republic.
1940 – The Tartu Art Museum was established in Tartu, Estonia.
1947 – The Screen Actors Guild implements an anti-Communist loyalty oath.
  1947   – American scientists John Bardeen and Walter Houser Brattain observe the basic principles of the transistor, a key element for the electronics revolution of the 20th century.
1950 – Lhamo Dondrub is officially named the 14th Dalai Lama.
  1950   – United Nations Security Council Resolution 89 relating to the Palestine Question is adopted.
1953 – The remaining human inhabitants of the Blasket Islands, Kerry, Ireland, are evacuated to the mainland.
1957 – Vickers Viscount G-AOHP of British European Airways crashes at Ballerup after the failure of three engines on approach to Copenhagen Airport. The cause is a malfunction of the anti-icing system on the aircraft. There are no fatalities.
1962 – President John F. Kennedy dedicates Washington Dulles International Airport, serving the Washington, D.C., region.
1967 – Vietnam War: Acting on optimistic reports that he had been given on November 13, U.S. President Lyndon B. Johnson tells the nation that, while much remained to be done, "We are inflicting greater losses than we're taking...We are making progress."
1968 – British European Airways introduces the BAC One-Eleven into commercial service.
  1968   – Viewers of the Raiders–Jets football game in the eastern United States are denied the opportunity to watch its exciting finish when NBC broadcasts Heidi instead, prompting changes to sports broadcasting in the U.S.
1969 – Cold War: Negotiators from the Soviet Union and the United States meet in Helsinki, Finland to begin SALT I negotiations aimed at limiting the number of strategic weapons on both sides.
1970 – Vietnam War: Lieutenant William Calley goes on trial for the My Lai Massacre.
  1970   – Luna programme: The Soviet Union lands Lunokhod 1 on Mare Imbrium (Sea of Rains) on the Moon. This is the first roving remote-controlled robot to land on another world and is released by the orbiting Luna 17 spacecraft.
1973 – Watergate scandal: In Orlando, Florida, U.S. President Richard Nixon tells 400 Associated Press managing editors "I am not a crook."
  1973   – The Athens Polytechnic uprising against the military regime ends in a bloodshed in the Greek capital.
1983 – The Zapatista Army of National Liberation is founded in Mexico.
1986 – The flight crew of Japan Airlines Flight 1628 are involved in a UFO sighting incident while flying over Alaska.
1989 – Cold War: Velvet Revolution begins: In Czechoslovakia, a student demonstration in Prague is quelled by riot police. This sparks an uprising aimed at overthrowing the communist government (it succeeds on December 29).
1990 – Fugendake, part of the Mount Unzen volcanic complex, Nagasaki Prefecture, Japan, becomes active again and erupts.
1993 – United States House of Representatives passes a resolution to establish the North American Free Trade Agreement.
  1993   – In Nigeria, General Sani Abacha ousts the government of Ernest Shonekan in a military coup.
1997 – In Luxor, Egypt, 62 people are killed by six Islamic militants outside the Temple of Hatshepsut, known as Luxor massacre.
2000 – A catastrophic landslide in Log pod Mangartom, Slovenia, kills seven, and causes millions of SIT of damage. It is one of the worst catastrophes in Slovenia in the past 100 years.
  2000   – Alberto Fujimori is removed from office as president of Peru.
2003 – Actor Arnold Schwarzenegger’s tenure as the governor of California began.
2012 – At least 50 schoolchildren are killed in an accident at a railway crossing near Manfalut, Egypt.
2013 – Fifty people are killed when Tatarstan Airlines Flight 363 crashes at Kazan Airport, Russia.
  2013   – A rare late-season tornado outbreak strikes the Midwest. Illinois and Indiana are most affected with tornado reports as far north as lower Michigan. In all around six dozen tornadoes touch down in approximately an 11-hour time period, including seven EF3 and two EF4 tornadoes.
2019 – The first known case of COVID-19 is traced to a 55-year-old man who had visited a market in Wuhan, Hubei Province, China.

Births

Pre-1600
AD 9 – Vespasian, Roman emperor (d. 79)
1019 – Sima Guang, Chinese politician (d. 1086)
1412 – Zanobi Strozzi, Italian painter (d. 1468)
1453 – Alfonso, Asturian prince (d. 1468)
1493 – John Neville, 3rd Baron Latimer, English politician (d. 1543)
1503 – Bronzino, Italian painter (d. 1572)
1576 – Roque González de Santa Cruz, Paraguayan missionary and saint (d. 1628)
1587 – Joost van den Vondel, Dutch poet and playwright (d. 1679)

1601–1900
1602 – Agnes of Jesus, French Catholic nun (d. 1634)
1612 – Dorgon, Chinese prince and regent (d. 1650)
1681 – Pierre François le Courayer, French theologian and author (d. 1776)
1685 – Pierre Gaultier de Varennes, Canadian commander and explorer (d. 1749)
1729 – Maria Antonia Ferdinanda, Sardinian queen consort (d. 1785)
1749 – Nicolas Appert, French chef, invented canning (d. 1841)
1753 – Gotthilf Heinrich Ernst Muhlenberg, American pastor and botanist (d. 1815)
1755 – Louis XVIII, king of France (d. 1824)
1765 – Jacques MacDonald, French general (d. 1840)
1769 – Charlotte Georgine, duchess of Mecklenburg-Strelitz (d. 1818)
1790 – August Ferdinand Möbius, German mathematician and astronomer (d. 1868)
1793 – Charles Lock Eastlake, English painter, historian, and academic (d. 1865)
1816 – August Wilhelm Ambros, Austrian composer and historian (d. 1876)
1827 – Petko Slaveykov, Bulgarian journalist and poet (d. 1895)
1835 – Andrew L. Harris, American general and politician, 44th Governor of Ohio (d. 1915)
1854 – Hubert Lyautey, French general and politician, French Minister of War (d. 1934)
1857 – Joseph Babinski, French neurologist and academic (d. 1932)
1866 – Voltairine de Cleyre, American author and activist (d. 1912)
1868 – Korbinian Brodmann, German neurologist and academic (d. 1918)
1877 – Frank Calder, English-Canadian journalist and businessman (d. 1943)
1878 – Grace Abbott, American social worker (d. 1939)
  1878   – Augustus Goessling, American swimmer and water polo player (d. 1963)
1886 – Walter Terence Stace, English-American philosopher, academic, and civil servant (d. 1967)
1887 – Bernard Montgomery, 1st Viscount Montgomery of Alamein, English field marshal (d. 1976)
1891 – Lester Allen, American screen, stage, vaudeville, circus actor, and film director (d. 1949)
1895 – Gregorio López, Mexican journalist, author, and poet (d. 1966)
1896 – Lev Vygotsky, Belarusian-Russian psychologist and philosopher (d. 1934)
1897 – Frank Fay, American actor, singer, and screenwriter (d. 1961)
1899 – Douglas Shearer, Canadian-American engineer (d. 1971)

1901–present
1901 – Walter Hallstein, German academic and politician, first President of the European Commission (d. 1982)
  1901   – Lee Strasberg, Ukrainian-American actor and director (d. 1982)
1902 – Eugene Wigner, Hungarian physicist and mathematician, Nobel Prize laureate (d. 1995)
1904 – Isamu Noguchi, American sculptor and architect (d. 1988)
1905 – Mischa Auer, Russian-American actor (d. 1967)
  1905   – Astrid of Sweden (d. 1935)
  1905   – Arthur Chipperfield, Australian cricketer (d. 1987)
1906 – Soichiro Honda, Japanese engineer and businessman, co-founded the Honda Motor Company (d. 1991)
  1906   – Rollie Stiles, American baseball player (d. 2007)
1907 – Israel Regardie, English occultist and author (d. 1985)
1911 – Christian Fouchet, French lawyer and politician, French Minister of the Interior (d. 1974)
1916 – Shelby Foote, American historian and author (d. 2005)
1917 – Ruth Aaronson Bari, American mathematician (d. 2005)
1919 – Kim Heungsou, Korean painter and educator (d. 2014)
1920 – Camillo Felgen, Luxembourgian singer-songwriter (d. 2005)
  1920   – Gemini Ganesan, Indian actor and director (d. 2002)
1921 – Albert Bertelsen, Danish painter and illustrator (d. 2019)
1922 – Stanley Cohen, American biochemist and academic, Nobel Prize laureate (d. 2020)
  1922   – Jack Froggatt, English footballer (d. 1993)
1923 – Hubertus Brandenburg, Swedish bishop (d. 2009)
  1923   – Mike Garcia, American baseball player (d. 1986)
  1923   – Aristides Pereira, Cape Verdean politician, first President of Cape Verde (d. 2011)
  1923   – Bert Sutcliffe, New Zealand cricketer and coach (d. 2001)
1925 – Jean Faut, American baseball player and bowler (d. 2023)
  1925   – Rock Hudson, American actor (d. 1985)
  1925   – Charles Mackerras, American-Australian oboe player and conductor (d. 2010)
1927 – Robert Drasnin, American clarinet player and composer (d. 2015)
  1927   – Fenella Fielding, English actress (d. 2018)
  1927   – Nicholas Taylor, Canadian geologist, businessman, and politician (d. 2020) 
1928 – Arman, French-American painter and sculptor (d. 2005)
  1928   – Rance Howard, American actor, producer, and screenwriter (d. 2017)
  1928   – Colin McDonald, Australian cricketer (d. 2021)
1929 – Gorō Naya, Japanese actor and director (d. 2013)
  1929   – Norm Zauchin, American baseball player (d. 1999)
1930 – Bob Mathias, American decathlete, actor, and politician (d. 2006)
1932 – Jeremy Black, English admiral (d. 2015)
1933 – Dan Osinski, American baseball player (d. 2013)
  1933   – Orlando Peña, Cuban-American baseball player and scout
1934 – Jim Inhofe, American soldier and politician, senior senator of Oklahoma
  1934   – Anthony King, Canadian-English Psephologist and academic (d. 2017)
  1934   – Terry Rand, American basketball player (d. 2014)
1935 – Bobby Joe Conrad, American football player
  1935   – Toni Sailer, Austrian skier and actor (d. 2009)
1936 – Crispian Hollis, English Roman Catholic bishop
1937 – Peter Cook, English comedian, actor, and screenwriter (d. 1995)
1938 – Charles Guthrie, Baron Guthrie of Craigiebank, Scottish general
  1938   – Gordon Lightfoot, Canadian singer-songwriter and guitarist
1939 – Auberon Waugh, English journalist and author (d. 2001)
1940 – Luke Kelly, Irish singer, folk musician and actor (d. 1984)
1942 – Derek Clayton, English-Australian runner
  1942   – Partha Dasgupta, Bangladeshi economist and academic
  1942   – Bob Gaudio, American singer-songwriter, keyboard player, and producer 
  1942   – Lesley Rees, English endocrinologist and academic
  1942   – István Rosztóczy, Hungarian-Japanese microbiologist and physician (d. 1993)
  1942   – Martin Scorsese, American director, producer, screenwriter, and actor
1943 – Lauren Hutton, American model and actress 
1944 – Jim Boeheim, American basketball player and coach
  1944   – Malcolm Bruce, English-Scottish journalist, academic, and politician
  1944   – Gene Clark, American singer-songwriter and musician (d. 1991) 
  1944   – Danny DeVito, American actor, director, and producer
  1944   – Rem Koolhaas, Dutch architect and academic, designed the Seattle Central Library
  1944   – Lorne Michaels, Canadian-American screenwriter and producer, created Saturday Night Live
  1944   – Tom Seaver, American baseball pitcher (d. 2020)
  1944   – Sammy Younge Jr., American civil rights activist (d. 1966)
1945 – Lesley Abdela, English journalist and activist
  1945   – Jeremy Hanley, English accountant and politician, British Minister of State for Foreign Affairs
  1945   – Elvin Hayes, American basketball player and sportscaster
  1945   – Roland Joffé, English-French director, producer, and screenwriter
1946 – Martin Barre, English guitarist and songwriter 
  1946   – Terry Branstad, American soldier, lawyer, and politician, 39th Governor of Iowa
  1946   – Petra Burka, Dutch-Canadian figure skater and coach
1947 – Rod Clements, British singer-songwriter, guitarist, and multi-instrumentalist
1948 – Howard Dean, American physician and politician, 79th Governor of Vermont
  1948   – East Bay Ray, American guitarist 
1949 – John Boehner, American businessman and politician, 53rd Speaker of the United States House of Representatives
  1949   – Nguyễn Tấn Dũng, Vietnamese soldier and politician, eighth Prime Minister of Vietnam
  1949   – Michael Wenden, Australian swimmer
1950 – Roland Matthes, German swimmer (d. 2019)
1951 – Butch Davis, American football player and coach
  1951   – Werner Hoyer, German economist and politician
  1951   – Dean Paul Martin, American singer, actor, and pilot (d. 1987)
  1951   – Stephen Root, American actor
  1951   – Jack Vettriano, Scottish painter and philanthropist
1952 – David Emanuel, Welsh fashion designer
  1952   – Ties Kruize, Dutch field hockey player
  1952   – Runa Laila, Bangladeshi singer
  1952   – Cyril Ramaphosa, South African businessman and politician, fifth President of South Africa
1953 – Babis Tennes, Greek footballer and manager
1954 – Chopper Read, Australian criminal and author (d. 2013)
1955 – Peter Cox, English singer-songwriter
  1955   – Yolanda King, American actress and activist (d. 2007)
  1955   – Dennis Maruk, Ukrainian-Canadian ice hockey player
1956 – Angelika Machinek, German glider pilot (d. 2006)
  1956   – Jim McGovern, Scottish politician
1957 – Jim Babjak, American guitarist and songwriter
1958 – Mary Elizabeth Mastrantonio, American actress and singer
1959 – Terry Fenwick, English footballer and manager
  1959   – William R. Moses, American actor and producer
  1959   – Jaanus Tamkivi, Estonian politician
1960 – Michael Hertwig, German footballer and manager
  1960   – Jonathan Ross, English actor and talk show host
  1960   – RuPaul, American drag queen performer, actor, and singer
1961 – Robert Stethem, American soldier (d. 1985)
  1961   – Pat Toomey, American businessman and politician
1962 – Dédé Fortin, Canadian singer-songwriter and guitarist (d. 2000)
1963 – Daniel Scott, American novelist and short story writer
1964 – Susan Rice, American academic and politician, 24th United States National Security Advisor
  1964   – Mitch Williams, American baseball player and sportscaster
1965 – Darren Beadman, Australian jockey
  1965   – Amanda Brown, Australian violinist and composer 
1966 – Alvin Patrimonio, Filipino basketball player and manager
  1966   – Ben Allison, American bassist and composer
  1966   – Jeff Buckley, American singer-songwriter and guitarist (d. 1997)
  1966   – Kate Ceberano, Australian singer-songwriter and actress 
  1966   – Richard Fortus, American guitarist, songwriter, and producer 
  1966   – Daisy Fuentes, Cuban-American model and actress
  1966   – Sophie Marceau, French actress, director, and screenwriter
1967 – Tab Benoit, American singer-songwriter and guitarist
  1967   – Ronnie DeVoe, American singer, producer, and actor 
1968 – Sean Miller, American basketball player and coach
1969 – Ryōtarō Okiayu, Japanese voice actor and singer
  1969   – Jean-Michel Saive, Belgian table tennis player
  1969   – Rebecca Walker, American author
1970 – Paul Allender, English guitarist and songwriter 
  1970   – Tania Zaetta, Australian actress
1971 – David Ramsey, American actor
1972 – Kimya Dawson, American singer-songwriter and guitarist 
  1972   – Joanne Goode, English badminton player
  1972   – Lorraine Pascale, English model and chef
  1972   – Leonard Roberts, American actor
1973 – Andreas Hedlund, Swedish singer-songwriter and producer
  1973   – Eli Marrero, Cuban-American baseball player, coach, and manager
  1973   – Bernd Schneider, German footballer
  1973   – Alexei Urmanov, Russian figure skater and coach
1974 – Eunice Barber, Sierra Leonean-French heptathlete and long jumper
  1974   – Leslie Bibb, American actress and producer
  1974   – Berto Romero, Spanish comedian and actor
1975 – Kinga Baranowska, Polish mountaineer
  1975   – Lee Carseldine, Australian cricketer
  1975   – Jerome James, American basketball player
1976 – Diane Neal, American actress and director
1977 – Ryk Neethling, South African swimmer
1978 – Glen Air, Australian rugby league player
  1978   – Zoë Bell, New Zealand actress and stuntwoman
  1978   – Rachel McAdams, Canadian actress
  1978   – Reggie Wayne, American football player
  1978   – Tom Ellis, Welsh actor
1979 – Matthew Spring, English footballer
1980 – Jay Bradley, American wrestler
  1980   – Isaac Hanson, American singer-songwriter and guitarist 
1981 – Sarah Harding, English singer, dancer, and actress (d. 2021)
  1981   – Doug Walker, American actor, comedian, film critic, internet personality, and filmmaker
1982 – Katie Feenstra-Mattera, American basketball player
  1982   – Yusuf Pathan, Indian cricketer
  1982   – Hollie Smith, New Zealand singer-songwriter and guitarist
1983 – Viva Bianca, Australian actress, producer, and screenwriter
  1983   – Ioannis Bourousis, Greek basketball player
  1983   – Ryan Bradley, American figure skater
  1983   – Ryan Braun, American baseball player
  1983   – Trevor Crowe, American baseball player
  1983   – Jodie Henry, Australian swimmer
  1983   – Harry Lloyd, English actor, producer, and screenwriter
  1983   – Nick Markakis, American baseball player
  1983   – Scott Moore, American baseball player
  1983   – Christopher Paolini, American author
1984 – Amanda Evora, American figure skater
  1984   – Park Han-byul, South Korean model and actress
1985 – Luis Aguiar, Uruguayan footballer
  1985   – Sékou Camara, Malian footballer (d. 2013)
  1985   – Carolina Neurath, Swedish journalist
1986 – Everth Cabrera, Nicaraguan baseball player
  1986   – Fabio Concas, Italian footballer
  1986   – Aaron Finch, Australian cricketer
  1986   – Nani, Portuguese footballer
  1986   – Greg Rutherford, English long jumper
1987 – Craig Noone, English footballer
  1987   – Gemma Spofforth, English swimmer
  1987   – Justine Michelle Cain, English actress
1988 – Durratun Nashihin Rosli, Malaysian rhythmic gymnast
1989 – Ryan Griffin, American football player
  1989   – Roman Zozulya, Ukrainian football striker
1992 – Katarzyna Kawa, Polish tennis player
  1992   – Danielle Kettlewell, Australian synchronised swimmer
  1992   – Alex Sheedy, Australian basketball player
1993 – Taylor Gold, American snowboarder
1995 – Elise Mertens, Belgian tennis player
  1995   – Panashe Muzambe, Scottish rugby union player
2000 – Joanne Züger, Swiss tennis player
2004 – Linda Nosková, Czech tennis player

Deaths

Pre-1600
 375 – Valentinian I, Roman emperor (b. 321)
 594 – Gregory of Tours, Roman bishop and saint (b. 538)
 641 – Emperor Jomei of Japan (b. 593)
 885 – Liutgard of Saxony (b. 845)
 935 – Chen Jinfeng, empress of Min (b. 893)
   935   – Wang Yanjun, emperor of Min (Ten Kingdoms)
1104 – Nikephoros Melissenos, Byzantine general (b. 1045)
1188 – Usama ibn Munqidh, Arab chronicler (b. 1095)
1231 – Elizabeth of Hungary (b. 1207)
1307 – Hethum II, King of Armenia (b. 1266)
  1307   – Leo III, King of Armenia (b. 1289)
1326 – Edmund FitzAlan, 9th Earl of Arundel, English politician (b. 1285)
1417 – Gazi Evrenos, Ottoman general (b. 1288)
1492 – Jami, Persian poet and saint (b. 1414)
1494 – Giovanni Pico della Mirandola, Italian philosopher and author (b. 1463)
1525 – Eleanor of Viseu, queen of João II of Portugal (b. 1458)
1558 – Mary I of England (b. 1516)
  1558   – Reginald Pole, English cardinal and academic (b. 1500)
  1558   – Hugh Aston, English composer (b. 1485)
1562 – Antoine of Navarre (b. 1518)
1592 – John III of Sweden (b. 1537)
1600 – Kuki Yoshitaka, Japanese commander (b. 1542)

1601–1900
1624 – Jakob Böhme, German mystic (b. 1575)
1632 – Gottfried Heinrich Graf zu Pappenheim, Bavarian field marshal (b. 1594)
1643 – Jean-Baptiste Budes, Comte de Guébriant, French general (b. 1602)
1648 – Thomas Ford, English viol player, composer, and poet (b. 1580)
1665 – John Earle, English bishop (b. 1601)
1668 – Joseph Alleine, English pastor and author (b. 1634)
1690 – Charles de Sainte-Maure, duc de Montausier, French general and politician (b. 1610)
1708 – Ludolf Bakhuizen, German-Dutch painter (b. 1631)
1713 – Abraham van Riebeeck, South African-Indonesian merchant and politician, Governor-General of the Dutch East Indies (b. 1653)
1747 – Alain-René Lesage, French author and playwright (b. 1668)
1768 – Thomas Pelham-Holles, 1st Duke of Newcastle, English lawyer and politician, Prime Minister of Great Britain (b. 1693)
1776 – James Ferguson, Scottish astronomer and instrument maker (b. 1710)
1780 – Bernardo Bellotto, Italian painter and illustrator (b. 1720)
1796 – Catherine the Great, of Russia (b. 1729)
1808 – David Zeisberger, Czech-American pastor and missionary (b. 1721)
1812 – John Walter, English Insurance underwriter and founder of The Times newspaper (b. 1738/1739)
1818 – Charlotte of Mecklenburg-Strelitz (b. 1744)
1835 – Carle Vernet, French painter and lithographer (b. 1758)
1865 – James McCune Smith, American physician and author (b. 1813)
1897 – George Hendric Houghton, American pastor and theologian (b. 1820)

1901–present
1902 – Hugh Price Hughes, Welsh theologian and educator (b. 1847)
1905 – Adolphe, Grand Duke of Luxembourg, (b. 1817)
1910 – Ralph Johnstone, American pilot (b. 1886)
1917 – Auguste Rodin, French sculptor and illustrator (b. 1840)
1922 – Robert Comtesse, Swiss lawyer and politician, 29th President of the Swiss Confederation (b. 1847)
1923 – Eduard Bornhöhe, Estonian author (b. 1862)
1924 – Gregory VII of Constantinople (b. 1850)
1928 – Lala Lajpat Rai, Indian author and politician (b. 1865)
1929 – Herman Hollerith, American statistician and businessman (b. 1860)
1932 – Charles W. Chesnutt, American lawyer, author, and activist (b. 1858)
1936 – Ernestine Schumann-Heink, German-American singer (b. 1861)
1937 – Jack Worrall, Australian footballer, cricketer, and coach (b. 1860)
1938 – Ante Trumbić, Croatian lawyer and politician, 20th Mayor of Split (b. 1864)
1940 – Eric Gill, English sculptor and typeface designer (b. 1882)
  1940   – Raymond Pearl, American biologist and academic (b. 1879)
1947 – Victor Serge, Russian historian and author (b. 1890)
1954 – Yitzhak Lamdan, Russian-Israeli poet and journalist (b. 1899)
1955 – James P. Johnson, American pianist and composer (b. 1894)
1958 – Mort Cooper, American baseball player (b. 1913)
1959 – Heitor Villa-Lobos, Brazilian guitarist and composer (b. 1887)
1968 – Mervyn Peake, English poet, author, and illustrator (b. 1911)
1971 – Gladys Cooper, English actress (b. 1888)
1973 – Mirra Alfassa, French-Indian spiritual leader (b. 1878)
1976 – Abdul Hamid Khan Bhashani, Bangladeshi scholar and politician (b. 1880)
1979 – John Glascock, English singer and bass player  (b. 1951)
1982 – Eduard Tubin, Estonian composer and conductor (b. 1905)
1986 – Georges Besse, French businessman (b. 1927)
1987 – Paul Derringer, American baseball player (b. 1906)
1988 – Sheilah Graham Westbrook, English-American actress, author, and journalist (b. 1904)
1989 – Costabile Farace, American criminal (b. 1960)
1990 – Robert Hofstadter, American physicist and academic, Nobel Prize laureate (b. 1915)
1992 – Audre Lorde, American poet, essayist, memoirist, and activist (b. 1934)
1993 – Gérard D. Levesque, Canadian lawyer and politician, fifth Deputy Premier of Quebec (b. 1926)
1995 – Alan Hull, English singer-songwriter and guitarist (b. 1945)
1998 – Kea Bouman, Dutch tennis player (b. 1903)
  1998   – Esther Rolle, American actress (b. 1920)
2000 – Louis Néel, French physicist and academic, Nobel Prize laureate (b. 1904)
2001 – Michael Karoli, German guitarist and songwriter (b. 1948)
  2001   – Harrison A. Williams, American lieutenant, lawyer, and politician (b. 1919)
2002 – Abba Eban, South African-Israeli soldier and politician, third Israeli Minister of Foreign Affairs (b. 1915)
  2002   – Frank McCarthy, American painter and illustrator (b. 1924)
2003 – Surjit Bindrakhia, Indian singer (b. 1962)
  2003   – Arthur Conley, American-Dutch singer-songwriter (b. 1946)
2004 – Mikael Ljungberg, Swedish wrestler and manager (b. 1970)
  2004   – Alexander Ragulin, Russian ice hockey player (b. 1941)
2005 – Marek Perepeczko, Polish actor and director (b. 1942)
2006 – Ruth Brown, American singer-songwriter and actress (b. 1928)
  2006   – Ferenc Puskás, Hungarian footballer and manager (b. 1927)
  2006   – Bo Schembechler, American football player and coach (b. 1929)
2007 – Aarne Hermlin, Estonian chess player (b. 1940)
2008 – George Stephen Morrison, American admiral (b. 1919)
  2008   – Pete Newell, American basketball player and coach (b. 1915)
2011 – Kurt Budke, American basketball player and coach (b. 1961)
2012 – Ponty Chadha, Indian businessman and philanthropist (b. 1957)
  2012   – Armand Desmet, Belgian cyclist (b. 1931)
  2012   – Lea Gottlieb, Hungarian-Israeli fashion designer, founded the Gottex Company (b. 1918)
  2012   – Freddy Schmidt, American baseball player (b. 1916)
  2012   – Billy Scott, American singer-songwriter (b. 1942)
  2012   – Bal Thackeray, Indian cartoonist and politician (b. 1926)
  2012   – Margaret Yorke, English author (b. 1924)
2013 – Zeke Bella, American baseball player (b. 1930)
  2013   – Alfred Blake, English colonel and lawyer (b. 1915)
  2013   – Syd Field, American screenwriter and producer (b. 1935)
  2013   – Doris Lessing, British novelist, poet, playwright, Nobel Prize laureate (b. 1919)
  2013   – Alex Marques, Portuguese footballer (b. 1993)
  2013   – Mary Nesbitt Wisham, American baseball player (b. 1925)
2014 – John T. Downey, American CIA agent and judge (b. 1930)
  2014   – Bill Frenzel, American lieutenant and politician (b. 1928)
  2014   – Ray Sadecki, American baseball player (b. 1940)
  2014   – Patrick Suppes, American psychologist and philosopher (b. 1922)
2015 – John Leahy, English lawyer and diplomat, High Commissioner to Australia (b. 1928)
  2015   – Rahim Moeini Kermanshahi, Iranian poet and songwriter (b. 1926)
2019 – Tuka Rocha, Brazilian race car driver (b. 1982)
2021 – Young Dolph, American rapper (b. 1985)

Holidays and observances
 Athens Polytechnic Uprising Remembrance Day (Greece)
 Christian feast days:
 Acisclus
 Aignan of Orleans
 Elizabeth of Hungary
 Gennadius of Constantinople (Greek Orthodox Church)
 Gregory of Tours (Roman Catholic Church)
 Gregory Thaumaturgus
 Hilda of Whitby
 Hugh of Lincoln
 November 17 (Eastern Orthodox liturgics)
 International Students' Day
 Martyrs' Day (Orissa, India) 
 Presidents Day (Marshall Islands) 
 World Prematurity Day

References

External links

 
 
 

Days of the year
November